The Regent's Daughter (French: Une Fille du Régent) is a historical novel by Alexandre Dumas, written in 1845, and later adapted as a "serio-comic" play in five acts. It has sometimes been subtitled as a sequel to The Conspirators.

In 1957-1958 it was also adapted into a newspaper comic by Gilbert Bloch.

References

1845 French novels
Novels by Alexandre Dumas
French adventure novels
French historical novels
Novels set in Early Modern France
Novels set in the 18th century
French novels adapted into plays
French plays
Novels adapted into comics